Provincial Municipal Courts of Vietnam are lower level courts in Vietnam's judicial system. These courts are essentially provincial courts and report directly to the central government in Hanoi.

Other courts in Vietnam:

 Supreme People's Court of Vietnam
 Local Courts of Vietnam
 Military Courts of Vietnam

External links
Law enforcement in Vietnam

Judiciary of Vietnam
Government of Vietnam
Courts